Francisco Masip (8 August 1926 – 25 September 2015) was a Spanish professional cyclist. He was professional from 1948 until 1960.

Biography
Masip was born in Santa Coloma de Gramanet on August 8, 1926, and in Catalonia. He has lived in Santa Coloma de Gramenet for his entire life.

Career
He was the first Spanish cyclist to participate in five consecutive Tour de France editions, between 1951 and 1955. His cycling career spanned 16 seasons, from 1945 to 1960, in which he obtained a total of 19 victories.

Major results

1945
 3rd Trofeo Jaumendreu
1946
 5th Trofeo Jaumendreu
1948
 1st Trofeo Jaumendreu
 8th Overall Vuelta Ciclista a la Comunidad Valenciana
1949
 3rd National Climbing Championships
1950
 1st Trofeo Jaumendreu
 1st Trofeo Masferrer
 2nd Overall GP Catalunya
 3rd Overall Volta a Catalunya
1951
 2nd Overall Volta a Catalunya
1952
 6th Overall Volta a Catalunya
1953
 1st  Road race, National Road Championships
 2nd Overall Euskal Bizikleta
1st Stage 2
 2nd Overall Volta a Catalunya
1954
 1st Clásica a los Puertos
 2nd Overall Volta a Tarragona
 4th Overall Vuelta a Aragón
1st Stage 2
 7th Overall Euskal Bizikleta
1955
 1st  Overall Vuelta Ciclista a la Comunidad Valenciana
1st Stages 1 & 6
 1st Stage 6a Vuelta a Andalucía
 2nd Clásica a los Puertos
 3rd Trofeo Masferrer
1956
 1st Trofeo Masferrer
 3rd Road race, National Road Championships
 3rd Overall Volta a Catalunya
 3rd National Climbing Championships
1959
 6th Overall Euskal Bizikleta

Grand Tour results

Tour de France
 1951: 59th
 1952: 30th
 1953: 46th
 1954: 55th
 1955: DNF

Vuelta a España
 1948: DNF
 1955: 31st
 1956: 28th
 1957: 18th
 1958: DNF

Giro d'Italia
 1954: 39th

References

External links
 

1926 births
2015 deaths
Spanish male cyclists
Spanish Vuelta a España stage winners
Cyclists from Catalonia
Sportspeople from Santa Coloma de Gramenet
20th-century Spanish people